Cheillophota is a genus of moths of the family Erebidae. The genus was defined by George Thomas Bethune-Baker in 1908. All of the species are found in New Guinea.

Species
Cheillophota costistrigata Bethune-Baker, 1908
Cheillophota dinawa (Bethune-Baker, 1908)
Cheillophota nigra (Bethune-Baker, 1908)
Cheillophota owgarra (Bethune-Baker, 1908)

References

Herminiinae